This is a list of notable Buddhists or Buddhist practitioners who live or lived in the United States. This list includes both formal teachers of Buddhism, and people notable in other areas who are publicly Buddhist or who have espoused Buddhism in America.

Academia 
 Dr. Dennis Hirota is a professor in the Department of Shin Buddhism at Ryukoku University in Kyoto, Japan.  He was born in Berkeley, California in 1946 and received his B.A. from University of California, Berkeley.  In 2008, he was a visiting professor of Buddhism at Harvard Divinity School where his studies focused on the Buddhist monk Shinran.
 Seth Evans is a scholar and educator who specializes in the Abhidhamma Pitaka (abhidhammapiṭaka) and the Visuddhimagga. He is known for his work in the phenomenological aspects of Buddhist psychology. Evans also plays bass for the punk-rock band The Out of Sorts.
 Taitetsu Unno was a scholar, lecturer, and author on the subject of Pure Land Buddhism.  His work as a translator has been responsible for making many important Buddhist texts available to the English-speaking world and he is considered one of the leading authorities in the United States on Shin Buddhism, a branch of Pure Land Buddhism.

Actors 

 Anthony Lee, (1981-2000), was an American actor and playwright. (Soka Gakkai International)
 Benedict Cumberbatch (1976- )  is an American-British buddhist actor.He is famous for Dr.Strange (2021), The Imitation Game (2014) and Spider-man:No Way Home (2021).(Theravada).
 Brad Pitt (1963- ) is an American actor and film producer.
 Celeste Lecesne, American actor, author, screenwriter, LGBT rights activist, founder of The Trevor Project (Soka Gakkai International)
 Chris Evans (1981- ), is an American buddhist actor. He is well known as Captain America. He is a student of Indian Buddhism. (Theravada)
 Chris Kattan, American actor, comedian and author. (Tibetan Buddhism)
 David Labrava, is an actor, writer, tattoo artist, former member of the Hells Angels, and motorcycle enthusiast best known for playing Happy Lowman in the FX series Sons of Anarchy and its spinoff Mayans M.C. (Zen)
 Drew Carey, is an American actor, comedian, game show host and photographer.(Theravada)
 Duncan Trusell (1974- ), is an American actor and stand-up comic, known for his podcast The Duncan Trussell Family Hour. (Tibetan Buddhism)
 Elliot Page, is an American-Canadian actor and activists. (Tibetan Buddhism)
 Garry Shandling (1949–2016), was an American actor and comedian. (Zen)
 George Takei, American actor and author (Theravada)
 Harrison Ford (1942- ) is an American actor. His films have grossed more than $5.4 billion in North America and more than $9.3 billion worldwide, making him the seventh-highest-grossing actor in North America.
 Jeff Bridges (1949- ), is an American actor. (zen)
 Jeremy Piven, is an American actor, comedian and producer. (zen)
 Jet Li, American-Chinese martial artist,actor (Tibetan Buddhist)
 John Astin is an American actor best known for playing Gomez Addams on The Addams Family
 Keanu Reeves (1964- ), American- Canadian Actor  and became Lord Buddha in Little Buddha (1993) and Neo in The Matrix film series . (Theravada) 
 KevJumba (born June 12, 1990) is an American former YouTuber and actor.
 Mandy Patinkin (1952– ) is an American actor and singer, known for his work in musical theatre, television and film.
 Martin Starr (1983– ), is an American actor and comedian. (Theravada)
 Michael Imperioli (1966– ), is an American actor, writer, director and musician. In 2008, Imperioli became a Buddhist.
 Oliver Stone (born September 15, 1946) is an American film director, producer, and screenwriter. Stone won an Academy Award for Best Adapted Screenplay as writer of Midnight Express (1978), and wrote the gangster film remake Scarface (1983). Stone achieved prominence as writer and director of the war drama Platoon (1986), which won Academy Awards for Best Director and Best Picture. 
 Orlando Bloom (1977- ), American-English actor. Well known for Will turner in Pirates of the Caribbean film series, Elf Legolas in Lord of Rings movie series.
 Pattrick Duffy (1949- ), is an American actor and director widely known for his role on the CBS primetime soap opera Dallas, where he played Bobby Ewing, the youngest son of Miss Ellie, and the nicest brother of J.R. Ewing from 1978 to 1985 and from 1986 to 1991. The actor was brought closer to the teachings of Buddhism by his late wife, the ballet dancer Carlyn Rosser (1939-2017). He has now been practicing religion for almost 50 years and describes it as an "Essential part" of his life. (Soka Gakkai International)
 Peter Coyote (1941–), American actor and author (Zen, ordained priest)
 Richard Gere, is an American actor. He began in films in the 1970s, playing a supporting role in Looking for Mr. Goodbar (1977) and a starring role in Days of Heaven (1978). (Tibetan Buddhism)
 Robert Downey Jr. (1965-), American Jewish Buddhist who is well known as Iron Man. He has said many times that Buddhism has helped him with his drug and alcohol addiction. (Theravada)
 Ron Glass (1945-2016), is an American actor and comedian.
 Steven Seagal, American actor and aikido expert (Tibetan Buddhism)

Actresses 
 Angelina Jolie is an American actress, filmmaker, and humanitarian. The recipient of numerous accolades, including an Academy Award and three Golden Globe Awards, she has been named Hollywood's highest-paid actress multiple times.
 Edith Falco (born July 5, 1963) is an American actress. She is best known for her roles as Carmela Soprano on the HBO series The Sopranos (1999–2007), and as Nurse Jackie Peyton on the Showtime series Nurse Jackie (2009–2015). She also played Diane Whittlesey in HBO's prison drama Oz (1997–2000).
 Kate Bosworth,  is an American actress and model. Following minor roles in the films The Horse Whisperer (1998) and Remember the Titans (2000), she rose to prominence with her role as a young surfer in the box-office hit Blue Crush (2002).
 Kiều Chinh (born in Hanoi 1937) is a Vietnamese-American actress, producer, humanitarian, lecturer and philanthropist.
 Jennifer Aniston (1965- ), American actress and producer. She famous for Friends (Zen)
 Kate Hudson (1979- ), is an American actress and businesswoman.(Zen)
 Koo Stark (1956-),  is an American photographer and actress, known for her relationship with Prince Andrew. She is a patron of the Julia Margaret Cameron Trust, museum of the Victorian pioneer photographer.
 Lindsay Crouse is an American actress.
 Luana Anders (1938 – 1996) was an American film and television actress and screenwriter.
 Lucy Liu (born December 2, 1968) is an American actress, producer, director, and artist. Her accolades include winning a Critics' Choice Television Award, two Screen Actors Guild Awards and a Seoul International Drama Award, in addition to nominations for a Primetime Emmy Award.
 Malin Akerman (1978- ) is a Swedish-American raised in Canada, actress, producer and model.
 Marcia Wallace, American actress, voice artist, comedian
 Ming-Na Wen (born November 20, 1963) is an American actress and model. She is best known for voicing Mulan in the animated film Mulan and its sequel, and for portraying Melinda May / The Cavalry in Marvel's Agents of S.H.I.E.L.D. (2013–2020). She was named [[TVLine|TVLines Performer of the Week]] for her work in the episode, "Melinda".
 Sarah Jessica Parker (1965) is an American actress and television producer.
 Sharon Stone, American actress, producer, and former fashion model
 Angelica Ross (born 1980) is an American actress, businesswoman, and transgender rights advocate. A self-taught computer programmer, she went on to become founder and CEO of TransTech Social Enterprises, a firm that helps employ transgender people in the tech industry.
 Uma Thurman (born April 29, 1970) is an American actress, writer, producer, and model. She has acted in a variety of films, from romantic comedies and dramas to science fiction and action films.She was brought up a Buddhist by her dad. In fact, her father was the first westerner to be ordained as a Tibetan Buddhist monk. Uma's name is derived from the Tibetan name ‘Dbuma Chenpo’ (the ‘db’ is silent) – meaning, ‘the great middle way’.

 Art 
 Paul Reps (September 15, 1895 – July 12, 1990) was an American artist, poet, and author. He is best known for his unorthodox haiku-inspired poetry that was published from 1939 onwards. He is considered one of America's first haiku poets.
 Elaine Hamilton-O'Neal (October 13, 1920 – March 15, 2010), professionally known as Elaine Hamilton, was an internationally known American abstract painter and muralist born near Catonsville, Maryland.

 Business 

 Bill Gates (1955-  ), is an American business magnate, software developer, investor, author, and philanthropist. He is a co-founder of Microsoft, along with his late childhood friend Paul Allen. During his career at Microsoft, Gates held the positions of chairman, chief executive officer (CEO), president and chief software architect, while also being the largest individual shareholder until May 2014.
 Jack Dorsey,(1976- ) is an American technological entrepreneur and philanthropist who is the co-founder and former CEO of Twitter, as well as the founder and CEO of Block, Inc., a financial payments company. (Theravada)
 Nita Ing (born 17 March 1955, in Taipei) is the Taiwanese-American president of Continental Engineering Corporation and the former chairman of the board of the Taiwan High Speed Rail Corporation, the company which built a high-speed railway system from Taipei to Kaohsiung. A supporter of the Democratic Progressive Party, she had been an advisor to the former President Chen Shui-bian.
 Priscilla Chan (born February 24, 1985) is an American philanthropist and a former pediatrician. She and her husband, Mark Zuckerberg, a co-founder and CEO of Meta Platforms, established the Chan Zuckerberg Initiative in December 2015, with a pledge to transfer 99 percent of their Facebook shares, then valued at $45 billion.
 Steve Jobs, American businessman, entrepreneur, marketer, inventor and the CEO of Apple Inc (Zen)

 Directors 
 George Lucas (born May 14, 1944) is an American film director, producer, screenwriter, and entrepreneur.
 Richard Martini (born 12 March 1955) is an American film director,producer, screenwriter and freelance journalist.
 Shan Serafin (born November 18, 1982) is an American film director, screenwriter, and novelist. In both film and literature he is known for his work in the thriller and action genres. For stage, the majority of his productions fall under drama.
 Michael D. Akers (born September 5, 1970 in Ephrata, Pennsylvania) is an American film director, producer, screenwriter and editor.

 Poets 
 Albert Saijo (February 4, 1926 – June 2, 2011) was a Japanese-American poet associated with the Beat Generation. He and his family were imprisoned as part of the United States government's internment of Japanese Americans during World War II, during which time he wrote editorials on his experiences of internment for his high school newspaper. Saijo went on to serve in the U.S. Army and study at the University of Southern California. Later he became associated with Beat Generation figures including Jack Kerouac, with whom he wrote, traveled and became friends.
 Allen Ginsberg (June 3, 1926 – April 5, 1997) was an American poet and writer.
 Alurista, is a Chicano poet and activist.
 Gary Snyder (born May 8, 1930) is an American poet, essayist, lecturer, and environmental activist.
 Jack Kerouac, was an American novelist and poet who, alongside William S. Burroughs and Allen Ginsberg, was a pioneer of the Beat Generation.
 Jane Hirshfield (born February 24, 1953) is an American poet, essayist, and translator, known as 'one of American poetry's central spokespersons for the biosphere' and recognized as 'among the modern masters,' 'writing some of the most important poetry in the world today.'
 John S. Hall (born John Charles Hall''', September 2, 1960) is an American poet, author, singer and lawyer perhaps best known for his work with King Missile, an avant-garde band that he co-founded in 1986 and has since led in various incarnations.
 Steven Sater is a Tony Award, Grammy Award, and Laurence Olivier Award-winning American poet, playwright, lyricist, television writer and screenwriter. He is best known for writing the book and lyrics for the Tony Award-winning 2006 Broadway musical Spring Awakening.

 Politics 

 Bill Clinton, 42nd U.S. president from (1993-2001)
 David Ige is an American politician. He was the 8th Governor of Hawaii. A Democrat, he served in the Hawaii State Senate from 2003 to 2014 and the Hawaii House of Representatives from 1985 to 2003. In the 2014 gubernatorial election, he defeated incumbent Governor Neil Abercrombie in the Democratic primary, and won the general election over Republican nominee Duke Aiona. Ige was reelected in 2018.
 Colleen Hanabusa, U.S. Congresswoman (2011–), Democrat and lawyer from Hawaii. 
 Kazuhisa Abe (January 18, 1914 – May 18, 1996) was a Democratic state senator and justice of the Supreme Court of Hawaii.
 Mazie Hirono, U.S. Senator (2013–), U.S. Congresswoman (2007–2013) and Democrat from Hawaii; first elected female Senator from Hawaii, first Asian-American woman elected to the Senate, first U.S. Senator born in Japan and the nation's first Buddhist Senator.
 Hank Johnson, U.S. Congressman (2007–) and Democrat from Georgia; one of the first two Buddhists to serve in the United States Congress(Soka Gakkai International)

 Science 
 Chester Carlson, (February 8, 1906 – September 19, 1968) was an American physicist, inventor, and patent attorney born in Seattle, Washington.He invented Xerography.
 James H. Austin is an American neurologist and author. He is the author of the book Zen and the Brain. It establishes links between the neurophysiology of the human brain and the practice of meditation, and won the Scientific and Medical Network Book Prize for 1998. He has written five sequels: Zen-Brain Reflections (2006), Selfless Insight (2009), Meditating Selflessly (2011), Zen-Brain Horizons (2014) and Living Zen Remindfully (2016).
 James J. Hughes (born May 27, 1961) is an American sociologist and bioethicist. He is the executive director of the Institute for Ethics and Emerging Technologies.
 Joseph Goguen (June 28, 1941 – July 3, 2006) was an American computer scientist. He was professor of Computer Science at the University of California and University of Oxford, and held research positions at IBM and SRI International.
 Mark Epstein (born 1953) is an American author and psychotherapist who integrates Shakyamuni Buddha's teachings with Sigmund Freud's approaches to trauma. He often writes about the interface of Buddhism and psychotherapy.
 George I. Fujimoto (born July 1, 1920) is an American chemist of Japanese descent.
 Ted Fujita (1920–1998), was a Japanese-American meteorologist whose research primarily focused on severe weather. His research at the University of Chicago on severe thunderstorms, tornadoes, hurricanes, and typhoons revolutionized the knowledge of each. Although he is best known for creating the Fujita scale of tornado intensity and damage.
 Harvey Itano (1920–2010), biochemist and member of the United States National Academy of Sciences
 Mizuko Ito, cultural anthropologist at the University of California, Irvine
 Akiko Iwasaki, immunologist and professor at Yale University
 Michio Kaku, theoretical physicist specializing in string field theory
 Akihiro Kanamori, mathematician specializing in set theory.
 Jay Kochi (1927–2008), chemist.
 John Maeda, computer scientist, artist, professor at MIT
 Syukuro Manabe, 2021 Nobel Laureate in Physics.
 Yoky Matsuoka, computer scientist; 2007 MacArthur Fellow.
 Horace Yomishi Mochizuki (1937–1989), mathematician specializing in group theory
 Shuji Nakamura, 2014 Nobel Laureate in Physics.
 Yoichiro Nambu (1921–2015), 2008 Nobel Laureate in Physics
 Isaac Namioka (1928–2019), mathematician who worked in general topology and functional analysis
 Charles J. Pedersen (1904–1989), 1987 Nobel laureate in Chemistry; his mother was Japanese
 Gordon H. Sato (1927–2017), cell biologist and member of the United States Nanal Academy of Sciences
 Ryuzo Yanagimachi, reproductive biologist and member of the United States National Academy of Sciences

 Singers 
 Adam Yauch -better known under the stage name MCA, was an American rapper, bass player, filmmaker and a founding member of the hip hop group Beastie Boys.
 Alanis Morissette (1974- ) is a Canadian-American singer, songwriter, and actress. Known for her emotive mezzo-soprano voice and confessional songwriting, Morissette began her career in Canada in the early 1990s with two mildly successful dance-pop albums.
 Aliana Lohan (born December 22, 1993) is an American singer, actress, fashion model and television personality.Ali Lohan is a Buddhist by religion. She converted to Buddhism after being raised in Catholicism.
 Belinda Carlisle, American singer (Soka Gakkai international)
 Brad Warner (1964) is an American Sōtō Zen monk, author, blogger, documentarian and punk rock bass guitarist.
 Buster Williams American jazz bassist
 Chi Cheng(July 15, 1970 – April 13, 2013) was an American musician and poet, best known as the bassist and backing vocalist for the American alternative metal band Deftones.
 Chynna Rogers, was an American rapper, disc jockey, and model who was signed by Ford Modeling Agency at the age of 14 and affiliated with the ASAP Mob.
 Courtney Love, American singer-songwriter  (Soka Gakkai International)
 Duncan Sheik American singer-songwriter and composer(Soka Gakkai International )
 Combat Jack  (July 8, 1964 – December 20, 2017), known professionally as Combat Jack, was a Haitian-American hip hop music attorney, executive, journalist, editor and podcaster.
 David Bennett Cohen (born August 4, 1942) is an American musician best known as the original keyboardist and one of the guitar players for the late-1960s psychedelic rock and blues band Country Joe and the Fish.
 Earl Sweatshirt, American rapper, songwriter, and record producer. (Nichiren Buddhism)
 Eric Erlandson  (1963- ) is an American musician, guitarist, and writer, primarily known as founding member, songwriter and lead guitarist of alternative rock band Hole from 1989 to 2002.Erlandson has practiced Buddhism since 1992.
 Jesse Michaels (born 1969) is an American songwriter, vocalist, guitarist, artist, and author from Berkeley, California.
 John Cage, is an American singer and composer
 Joseph Bowie, (1953- ) is an American jazz trombonist and vocalist. The brother of trumpeter Lester Bowie, Joseph is known for leading the jazz-punk group Defunkt and for membership in the Ethnic Heritage Ensemble.
 June Millington (born April 14, 1948) is a Filipino American guitarist, songwriter, producer, educator, and actress.
 Katy Perry is an American singer, songwriter, and television judge. She is known for her influence on the pop sound and style of the 2010s. Pursuing a career in gospel music at 16, Perry released her commercially unsuccessful debut album, Katy Hudson (2001), under Red Hill Records.
 Phạm Phi Nhung (10 April 1970 – 28 September 2021) was a Vietnamese-American singer, actress and Humanitarian. She specialised in Dan Ca and Tru Tinh music. She sang for Paris By Night and Van Son and also acted in their plays and Tinh production. She also recorded music for Lang Van.
 Peter Rowan (1942- ) is an American bluegrass musician and composer. Rowan plays guitar and mandolin, yodels and sings.
 Laurie Anderson (1947- ),  is an American avant-garde artist, composer, musician, and film director whose work spans performance art, pop music, and multimedia projects. Initially trained in violin and sculpting, Anderson pursued a variety of performance art projects in New York during the 1970s, focusing particularly on language, technology, and visual imagery. She became more widely known outside the art world when her single "O Superman" reached number two on the UK singles chart in 1981. She also starred in and directed the 1986 concert film Home of the Brave.
 Nikolas Schreck is an American singer-songwriter, musician, author, film-maker and Tantric Buddhist religious teacher based in Berlin, Germany.
 Roberta Donnay (born August 10, 1966, Washington, D.C.) is an American jazz singer. jazz vocalist, composer, and band leader produced by Orrin Keepnews. She is a practicing Buddhist.
 Stacey Q, is an American pop singer, songwriter, dancer and actress. Her best-known single, John Mitchell's "Two of Hearts", released in 1986, reached number one in Canada, number three on the US Billboard Hot 100 and the top ten in five other countries.
 Steven Sater American playwright, lyricist and screenwriter best known for Spring Awakenings''(Soka Gakkai International)
 Suzanne Nadine Vega is an American singer-songwriter best known for her folk-inspired music. Vega's music career spans almost 40 years.
 Tina Turner, American singer-songwriter.
 Wayne Shorter, (born August 25, 1933) is an American jazz saxophonist and composer.

Soldiers 

 Aidan Delgado, is an American attorney, author, and war veteran. His 2007 book The Sutras of Abu Ghraib detailed his experiences during his deployment in Iraq.
 George Lennon (25 May 1900 – 20 February 1991) was an American-Irish Republican Army leader during the Irish War of Independence and the Irish Civil War.
 John David Provoo (August 6, 1917 – August 28, 2001) was United States Army staff sergeant.
 Shiro Kashiwa (October 24, 1912 – March 13, 1998) was the first Attorney General of Hawaii to be appointed after it became a state in 1959.
 Ming Chang – rear admiral (upper half), U.S. Navy, retired. Department of Navy Inspector General, 1987–1990
 Dan Choi – first lieutenant, U.S. Army. Gay rights advocate.
 Viet Xuan Luong– Major General, US Army Japan 
Lapthe Flora – Major General, Combined Joint Task Force – Horn of Africa

Sports 

 Anthony Ervin, American gold medalist swimmer.(Zen)
 Dave Bautista (born January 18, 1969) is an American actor and former professional wrestler.
 DeAndre Jordan (born July 21, 1988) is an American professional basketball player for the Denver Nuggets of the National Basketball Association (NBA). He played one season of college basketball for the Texas A&M Aggies.
 Phil Jackson, is an American former professional basketball player, coach, and executive. A power forward, Jackson played 12 seasons in the NBA, winning NBA championships with the New York Knicks in 1970 and 1973. Jackson was the head coach of the Chicago Bulls from 1989 to 1998, leading them to six NBA championships. He then coached the Los Angeles Lakers from 1999 to 2004 and again from 2005 to 2011; the team won five league titles under his leadership. Jackson's 11 NBA titles as a coach surpassed the previous record of nine set by Red Auerbach.
 Matt Sydal, is an American professional wrestler currently signed to All Elite Wrestling (AEW).
 Metta Sandiford-Artest (born November 13, 1979) is an American former professional basketball player.
 Sandje Ivanchukov, (born July 23, 1960 – August 29, 2007) was an American soccer defender who played professionally in the North American Soccer League, American Soccer League and Major Indoor Soccer League.
 Tiger Woods (1975- ) is an American professional golfer. He is tied for first in PGA Tour wins, ranks second in men's major championships, and holds numerous golf records. Woods is widely regarded as one of the greatest golfers of all time and one of the most famous athletes in history. He is an inductee of the World Golf Hall of Fame.
 Orlando Cepeda – American former Major League Baseball first baseman and member of the Hall of Fame.

Writers 
 E. Hoffmann Price (July 3, 1898 – June 18, 1988) was an American writer of popular fiction (he was a self-titled 'fictioneer') for the pulp magazine marketplace. 
 Jess Row (born 1974 in Washington, D.C.) is an American short story writer, novelist, and professor.
 Kenneth Pai, Chinese-American writer
 Ṭhānissaro Bhikkhu (1949–), known for his translations of almost 1,000 Sutta in all and providing the majority of the sutta translations in a website known as "Access to Insight"
 Jack Kornfield (1945–), American book writer, student of renowned forest monk Ajahn Chah, and teacher of Theravada Buddhism
 Joseph Goldstein (1944–), one of the first American Vipassana teachers, contemporary author of numerous popular books on Buddhism
 Maya Soetoro-Ng (1970-), Indonesian-American writer, university instructor and maternal half-sister of Barack Obama, the 44th President of the United States

Zen Teachers 
 Adyashanti (1962–)
 Robert Baker Aitken (1917–2010)
 Anne Hopkins Aitken (1911–1994)
 Reb Anderson (1943–)
 Zentatsu Richard Baker (1936–)
 Joko Beck (1917–2011)
 Sherry Chayat (1943–)
 Issan Dorsey (1933–1990)
 Zoketsu Norman Fischer (1946–)
 James Ishmael Ford (1948–)
 Tetsugen Bernard Glassman (1939–2018)
 Paul Haller
 Ralph Chapin
 Cheri Huber (1944)
 Sozui Schubert (1965) hvzc.org
 Soenghyang (Barbara Rhodes, 1948–)
 Philip Kapleau (1912–2004)
 Houn Jiyu-Kennett (1924–1996)
 Bodhin Kjolhede (1948–)
 Jakusho Kwong (1935–)
 Taigen Dan Leighton (1950–)
 John Daido Loori (1931–2009)
 Dai Bai Zan Cho Bo Zen Ji (1954–)
 Heng Sure (1949–)
 Bonnie Myotai Treace (1956–)
 Brad Warner (1964–)

See also 

 Buddhas of Bamiyan
 Buddhist cosmology
 Buddhism and science
 List of Buddhists
 Buddhism and Christianity
 List of Korean Buddhists
 List of Marathi Buddhists
 Buddhism in the United States
 :Category:American Buddhists
 List of Buddhist temples in the United States

References

External links 

American
 
Buddhists